The R109 road is a regional road in west Dublin, Ireland.  It runs from Kylemore Road via Chapelizod, the Phoenix Park and the western edge of the city centre.

The official description of the R109 from the Roads Act 1993 (Classification of Regional Roads) Order 2012  reads:

R109: Chapelizod - Wolfe Tone Quay, Dublin

Between its junction with R112 at Kylemore Road and its junction with R148 at Frank Sherwin Bridge via Lucan Road, Anna Livia Bridge Chapelizod, Conyngham Road, Parkgate Street and Wolf Tone Quay all in the city of Dublin.

See also
Roads in Ireland
National primary road
National secondary road
Regional road

References

Regional roads in the Republic of Ireland
Roads in County Dublin
Roads in Dublin (city)